Fauerbach may refer to:

 Fauerbach (Usa), a river of Hesse, Germany, tributary of the Usa
 Fauerbach, a district of Friedberg, Hesse, Germany
 Fauerbach, a district of Nidda, Hesse, Germany
 Fauerbach vor der Höhe, a district of Butzbach, Hesse, Germany